The Tolman Medal is awarded each year by the Southern California Section of the American Chemical Society (SCALACS) for outstanding contributions to chemistry which include contributions in areas of fundamental studies, chemical technology, and significant contributions to chemical education or outstanding leadership in science on a national level. To be eligible for the Medal, the recipient must have accomplished the majority of his or her work while resident in Southern California.

The Medal is named for physicist and chemist Richard C. Tolman.

Recipients 
Source: SCALACS
 1960 William G. Young
 1961 Anton Burg
 1962 Ernest H. Swift
 1963 W. Conway Pierce
 1964 Arie J. Haagen-Smit
 1965 Thomas F. Doumani, Union Oil Company
 1966 Arthur Adamson, USC
 1967 Ulric B. Bray, Bray Oil Company
 1968 Francis E. Blacet, UCLA
 1969 Robert D. Vold, USC
 1970 Robert L. Pecsok, UCLA
 1971 Roland C. Hansford, Union Oil Company
 1972 James Bonner, Caltech
 1973 Howard Reiss, UCLA
 1974 John D. Roberts, Caltech
 1975 Dr. Corwin Hansch, Pomona College
 1976 F. Sherwood Rowland, U. C. Irvine
 1977 Sidney W. Benson, USC
 1978 Thomas C. Bruice, UCSB
 1979 Harry B. Gray, Caltech
 1980 Herbert D. Kaesz, UCLA
 1981 Paul D. Boyer, UCLA
 1982 Donald T. Sawyer, UCR
 1983 James N. Pitts, Air Pollution Research Center, UCR
 1984 Donald J. Cram, UCLA
 1985 Arnold O. Beckman, Beckman Instruments, Inc.
 1986 M. Frederick Hawthorne, UCLA
 1987 Clifford A. Bunton, UC, Santa Barbara
 1988 John D. Baldeschwieler, Caltech
 1989 Mostafa El-Sayed, UCLA
 1990 Linus Pauling, Caltech
 1991 George Olah, USC
 1992 Peter C. Ford, UC Santa Barbara
 1993 Charles L. Wilkins, UC Riverside
 1994 Jacqueline K. Barton, Caltech
 1995 Christopher S. Foote, UCLA
 1996 Larry R. Dalton, USC
 1997 Ahmed H. Zewail, Caltech
 1998 Kendall N. Houk, UCLA
 1999 Peter B. Dervan, Caltech
 2000 Dr. William Andrew Goddard III, Caltech
 2001 Peter M. Rentzepis, UC Irvine
 2002 Robert H. Grubbs, Caltech
 2003 Arieh Warshel, USC
 2004 Christopher Reed, UC Riverside
 2005 Fred Wudl, UCLA
 2006 G. K. Surya Prakash, USC Loker Hydrocarbon Research Institute
 2007 Barbara Finlayson-Pitts, UC Irvine
 2008 Joan S. Valentine, UCLA
 2009 Richard B. Kaner, UCLA
 2010 Dennis A. Dougherty, Caltech
 2011 Karl O. Christe, USC
 2012 John Bercaw, Caltech
 2013 Mark E. Thompson, USC
 2014 William J. Evans, UC Irvine
 2015 Michael Jung, UCLA
 2016 Paul S. Weiss, UCLA
 2017 Jeffrey I. Zink, UCLA
 2018 Clifford P. Kubiak, UC San Diego
 2019 A. S. Borovik, UCI
 2020 Pingyun Feng, UCR
 2021 Donald R. Blake, UCI

See also
List of chemistry awards
List of prizes named after people

References 

Awards of the American Chemical Society
American science and technology awards
Awards established in 1961
Science and technology in California
Southern California